The Forbidden Legend Sex & Chopsticks 2 is a 2009 Hong Kong sex film and sequel to The Forbidden Legend Sex & Chopsticks, adapted from Lanling Xiaoxiao Sheng's classical novel The Golden Lotus. It was produced by Wong Jing and directed by Man Kei Chin. The film stars Oscar Lam wai-kin, Hayakawa Serina, Wakana Hikaru, and Kaera Uehara.

Cast
 Oscar Lam wai-kin as Ximen Qing
 Hayakawa Serina as Pan Jinlian
 Wakana Hikaru as Ming Yue
 Kaera Uehara as Zi Yan/ Li Ping'er
 Liang Minyi as Chun Mei
 Tan Qiancong as Hua Zixu
 Angel Wu as Wu Song
 Frankie Ng Chi Hung as Wu Dalang

Release
It was released in Hong Kong on 1 April 2009.

References

External links

2009 films
Hong Kong erotic films
Films based on Jin Ping Mei
Films set in Hebei
Hong Kong sequel films
2000s erotic films
2000s Hong Kong films